It Is Never Too Late to Mend may refer to:

It Is Never Too Late to Mend (novel), an 1856 novel by Charles Reade
It Is Never Too Late to Mend (1911 film), an Australian film, based on the novel
It Is Never Too Late to Mend (1913 film), a 1913 film, based on the novel
It's Never Too Late to Mend, a 1937 British melodrama film, based on the novel